Tanymecica xanthoplaca is a moth in the Copromorphidae family, and the only species in the genus Tanymecica. It is found in Australia, where it has been recorded from Queensland.

The wingspan is about 30 mm. The forewings are pale fuscous, with darker fuscous streaks parallel to the veins and a few whitish dots. The basal half of the hindwings is pale-yellow and the terminal half dark-fuscous.

References

Natural History Museum Lepidoptera generic names catalog

Copromorphidae
Moths described in 1916